Erycibe is a genus of plants in the family Convolvulaceae, found in the Andaman Islands, Sri Lanka, India including Assam, Bangladesh, Myanmar, east Himalaya, southern and southeastern China including Hainan and Taiwan, Southeast Asia, Malesia, Papuasia, Australia, and Japan including the Ryukyu Islands.

Species
Currently accepted species include:

Erycibe aenea Prain
Erycibe albida Prain
Erycibe beccariana Hoogland
Erycibe borneensis (Merr.) Hoogland
Erycibe brassii Hoogland
Erycibe bullata Ridl. ex Hoogland
Erycibe carrii Hoogland
Erycibe citriniflora Griff.
Erycibe clemensiae Ooststr.
Erycibe coccinea (F.M.Bailey) Hoogland
Erycibe cochinchinensis Gagnep.
Erycibe coriacea Wall. ex Choisy
Erycibe crassipes Ridl. ex Hoogland
Erycibe crassiuscula Gagnep.
Erycibe elliptilimba Merr. & Chun
Erycibe expansa Wall. ex G.Don
Erycibe festiva Prain
Erycibe floribunda Pilg.
Erycibe forbesii Prain
Erycibe glaucescens Wall. ex Choisy
Erycibe glomerata Blume
Erycibe grandiflora Adelb. ex Hoogland
Erycibe grandifolia Merr. ex Hoogland
Erycibe griffithii C.B.Clarke
Erycibe hainanensis Merr.
Erycibe hellwigii Prain
Erycibe henryi Prain
Erycibe hollrungii Hoogland
Erycibe impressa Hoogland
Erycibe induta Pilg.
Erycibe kinabaluensis Hoogland
Erycibe laurifolia D.G.Long
Erycibe leucoxyloides King ex Ridl.
Erycibe macrophylla Hallier f.
Erycibe magnifica Prain
Erycibe maingayi C.B.Clarke
Erycibe malaccensis C.B.Clarke
Erycibe micrantha Hallier f.
Erycibe myriantha Merr.
Erycibe nitidula Pilg.
Erycibe obtusifolia Benth.
Erycibe oligantha Merr. & Chun
Erycibe paniculata Roxb.
Erycibe papuana Wernham
Erycibe pedicellata Ridl. ex Hoogland
Erycibe peguensis (C.B.Clarke) Prain
Erycibe praecipua Prain
Erycibe puberula Hoogland
Erycibe ramiflora Hallier f.
Erycibe ramosii Hoogland
Erycibe rheedei Blume
Erycibe sapotacea Hallier f. & Prain ex Prain
Erycibe sargentii Merr.
Erycibe schlechteri Pilg.
Erycibe schmidtii Craib
Erycibe sericea Hoogland
Erycibe sinii F.C.How
Erycibe stapfiana Prain
Erycibe stenophylla Hoogland
Erycibe strigosa Prain
Erycibe subglabra Scheff. ex Hoogland
Erycibe subsericea Hoogland
Erycibe subspicata Wall. ex G.Don
Erycibe sumatrensis Merr.
Erycibe terminaliflora Elmer
Erycibe timorensis Hallier f. ex Hoogland
Erycibe tixieri Deroin
Erycibe tomentosa Blume
Erycibe villosa Forman
Erycibe zippelii Hoogland

References

Convolvulaceae